I Love My Music is the third studio album by Wild Cherry, released in 1978. It includes "Don't Stop, Get Off," a single with no lyrics outside the title itself, sung in a strident voice, backed by horns playing a funky riff. Also featured on the album is "1 2 3 Kind of Love," which, while never released as a single, did receive radio airplay and is still played occasionally on beach music programs and oldies stations today.

The album entered Billboards Top 200 chart in early February 1978, then rose to its highest position at number 84 during the week of April 8.

Track listing
All tracks composed by Rob Parissi; except where indicated
 "I Love My Music"
 "Lana"
 "It's the Same Old Song" (Holland-Dozier-Holland)
 "Try One More Time"
 "Don't Stop, Get Off"
 "1 2 3 Kind of Love"
 "No Way Out Love Affair"
 "If You Want My Love" (W. Stoddart)
 "Fools Fall in Love"
 "This Old Heart of Mine (Is Weak for You)" (Holland-Dozier-Holland-Smoy)

References

1978 albums
Wild Cherry (band) albums
Epic Records albums